Siddhartha Ramchandra Jadhav (born 23 October 1981) is an Indian actor, entertainer and comedian from Sewri, Maharashtra. He has acted in television, Marathi and Hindi films. He has acted in several Bollywood movies like Golmaal and Golmaal Returns but he asserts that his first love is Marathi film, TV and stage. Jadhav also acted in a Bengali movie named Ami Subhash Bolchi with Mithun Chakraborty as the lead. Referred to in the media as the "Comedy King of Marathi Cinema".

Personal life
He is married to Trupti, they have two daughters.

Career
He made his acting debut from DD Sahyadri's Ek Shunya Baburao. Then he was also seen in supporting roles in Hasa Chakatfu, Ghadlay Bighadlay, Apan Yanna Pahilat Ka?, etc. In 2004, he made his film debut from Kedar Shinde's Aga Bai Arrecha!. Then he received offer of Jatra movie. He made his bollywood debut in 2006 in Rohit Shetty's movie Golmaal: Fun Unlimited as Sattu Supari. In the same year, he did a play named Lochya Zala Re. Later he has done many notable films including Bakula Namdeo Ghotale, Saade Maade Teen, De Dhakka, Me Shivajiraje Bhosale Boltoy, many more. He won the Best Actor in a Supporting Role award in Maharashtra Rajyapal Chitrapat Purasakar in 2008 for the movie De Dhakka. He also made his debut in Bengali movie Ami Shubhash Bolchi. He was a contestant on Sony TV's Comedy Circus Ka Naya Daur, Kahani Comedy Circus Ki, Comedy Circus Ke Ajoobe. He also appeared in Johnny Aala Re, Baa Bahoo Aur Baby, Sarabhai vs Sarabhai and Comedy Nights Bachao. He also was a contestant of Nach Baliye 8 with his wife. He also judge many reality shows including Maharashtracha Dancing Superstar, Dance Maharashtra Dance. In 2016, he did a play named Gela Udat. He also part of Simmba as Ganesh Tawde. In 2021, he was seen in Radhe as Ranjeet Mawani.

Filmography

Feature films

Stage

Television

Awards

 Fakt Marathi Cine Sanman – Best Performance in a Comic Role – Lochya Zaala Re
 Filmfare Marathi Awards – Best Supporting Actor – Dhurala
 Sakal Premiere Awards 2019 ( Entertainer Of The Year' Award).
 Loksatta Tarun Tejankit award 2021.
 Marathi Paaul Padate Pudhe Puraskaar: Zee Chitra Gaurav Puraskaar – 2021
 Maharashtracha Favourite Kon?: Favourite Comedian − 2013 Film − Kho Kho
 Maharashtracha Favourite Kon?: Favourite Supporting Actor − 2010 Film − Lalbaug Parel
Yuva Balgandharva Puraskaar 2007
Maharashtracha Favourite Kon?: Favourite Villain − 2008 Film − Galgale Nighale
Maharashtracha Favourite Kon?: Favourite Comedian − 2008 Film − De Dhakka 
Best Supporting Actor: Maharashtra Rajya Chitrapat Puraskaar −2008-Film- De Dhakka
Akhil Bhartiya Natya Parishad- Natyasampada Sposored Shankar Ghanekar Smriti Puraskkar – 2004
Maharashtra Rajya Professional Natya Spardha " Best Actor Award-2004-05" Play- "Jago Mohan Pyaare"
Maharashtra Rajya Professional Natya Spardha " Best Actor Award-2003-04" Play- "Lochya Zala Re"
Ekata Cultural Academy :- V.Shantaram Memorial Acting Award – 2005–06
Maharashtra Kala Niketan Acting Award 2005–06
Maharashtra Kala Niketan Acting Award 2005–06
DD Metro Superstar :- IInd rank Acting Competition
MANY Awards in Youth Festival Organised by University Of Mumbai – Gold and Silver Medals In Acting / Mime/ Mimicry/ Monoacting
Ravikiran Balnatya Spardha 1996– Best Actor IIRd Rank
Maharashtra Kala Niketan Acting Award 2005–06 Indian National Theatre (INT) – Best Comedian Award – 2002–03 – One Act Play "Laxminarayanacha Joda" Writer- Director Devendra Pem

See also
 Swapnil Joshi
 Bharat Jadhav
 Kedar Shinde
 Ankush Chaudhari

References

External links
 
 
 

Living people
1981 births
Indian male soap opera actors
Male actors in Marathi cinema
Indian male comedians
Male actors in Marathi theatre
Marathi actors